The Sverdrup Prize (Sverdrupprisen) is a Norwegian honorary award concerning the fields of theoretical and applied statistics.

History
It was established in the memory of Erling Sverdrup (1917–1994) who was professor of mathematical statistics and insurance mathematics with the Department of Mathematics at the University of Oslo from 1953 until his retirement in 1984. Sverdrup was instrumental in building up and modernising the fields of statistics and actuarial science in Norway.

In 2007, the Norwegian Statistical Association  (Norsk statistisk forening)  announced the creation of the Sverdrup Prize, with the first prizes to be awarded in 2009. There is one Sverdup Prize to a prominent statistician ("an eminent representative of the statistics profession") and a second award to a younger statistician who has authored or coauthored a high quality journal article. The prizes entail a diploma and a stipend and are awarded every second year, typically in connection with the biennial conferences of the Norwegian Statistical Association.

Winners

References

Other sources
 Norwegian Statistical Association's Sverdrup Prize
 Sverdrup Prize awarded Nils Lid Hjort, 2013
 Sverdrup Prize awarded Tore Schweder, 2011
 Sverdrup Prize awarded Dag Tjøstheim, 2009

Academic awards
Norwegian awards